Dicercomorpha is a genus of beetles in the family Buprestidae, containing the following species:

 Dicercomorpha albosparsa (Laporte & Gory, 1836)
 Dicercomorpha argenteoguttata Thomson, 1879
 Dicercomorpha dammarana Holynski, 2001
 Dicercomorpha farinosa Thomson, 1879
 Dicercomorpha fasciata Waterhouse, 1913
 Dicercomorpha grosseguttata Thomson, 1878
 Dicercomorpha interrupta Deyrolle, 1864
 Dicercomorpha javanica (Laporte & Gory, 1836)
 Dicercomorpha multiguttata Deyrolle, 1864
 Dicercomorpha mutabilis Saunders, 1874
 Dicercomorpha strandi Obenberger, 1928
 Dicercomorpha subcincta Deyrolle, 1864
 Dicercomorpha viridisparsa Thery, 1935
 Dicercomorpha vitalisi Bourgoin, 1922

References

Buprestidae genera